Xylergates is a genus of beetles in the family Cerambycidae, containing the following species:

 Xylergates capixaba Giorgi & Corbett, 2005
 Xylergates elaineae Gilmour, 1962
 Xylergates lacteus Bates, 1864
 Xylergates picturatus Lane, 1957
 Xylergates pulcher Lane, 1957

References

Acanthocinini